Archery at the 2014 Asian Games was held in Gyeyang Asiad Archery Field, Incheon, South Korea from 23 to 28 September 2014. Four competitions were held in men and women's recurve and in men and women's compound.

Schedule

Medalists

Recurve

Compound

Medal table

Participating nations
A total of 222 athletes from 27 nations competed in archery at the 2014 Asian Games:

References

External links
Schedule and results

 
2014
Asian Games
2014 Asian Games events
2014 Asian Games